The FPS Justice, formerly the Ministry of Justice, is a federal public service of Belgium. It was created by royal order on 23 May 2001, as part of the plans of the Verhofstadt I Government to modernise the federal administration. The transformation from a ministry into a federal public service was completed on 15 July 2002.

The FPS Justice is responsible to the minister of justice.

Organisation

The FPS Justice is currently organised into three directorates-general:
The Directorate-General for Judicial Organisation
The Directorate-General for Legislation and Fundamental Rights and Freedoms
The Directorate-General for Correctional Facilities

Several independent organisations resort under the FPS Justice, such as the Gambling Commission. In addition, the FPS Justice is also responsible for the Belgian Official Journal. The Belgian State Security Service is responsible to the minister of justice as well.

See also

 Justice ministry
 Politics of Belgium

External links
 Website of the FPS Justice Belgium

Justice
Ministries established in 2001
2001 establishments in Belgium